Early general elections were held in Transjordan on 10 June 1931, following the dissolution of the Legislative Council elected in 1929 after it failed to pass the budget annex.

Electoral system
The 1928 basic law provided for a unicameral Legislative Council. The 16 elected members were joined by the six-member cabinet, which included the Prime Minister. The term length was set at three years.

Results
The sixteen elected members were:

Aftermath
Abdallah Sarraj formed a new government, which also included Tawfik Abu al-Huda, Odeh al-Qsous, Omar Hekmat, 
Shokri Sha'sha'ah and Adeeb al-Kayed. On 18 October 1933 a new government was formed by Ibrahim Hashem, which included Odeh Al-Qsous, Sa`id al-Mufti, Shokri Sha'sha'ah, Hashem Khiar and Qasem Al-Hendawi. The Council became the first to serve a full term, and lasted until 10 June 1934.

References

Transjordan
Elections in Jordan
General election
Transjordan